Darko is an Ashanti surname. Notable people with the Ashanti surname include:

Amma Darko (born 1956), Ghanaian novelist
George Darko (born 1951), Ghanaian musician
Jesse Darko (born 1993), Austrian footballer
John Martin Darko (1945–2013), Ghanaian Roman Catholic bishop
Kwabena Darko (born 1942), Ghanaian entrepreneur and politician
Kwame Obeng Darko (born 1986), Ghanaian footballer and rapper

See also
Kwabena Okyere Darko-Mensah, Ghanaian politician
Kwadwo Adjei-Darko, Ghanaian politician

Surnames of Ashanti origin
Surnames of Akan origin